Union Sportive Monastirienne, also known as USM, is a football club from Monastir in Tunisia. It plays in the Tunisian Ligue Professionnelle 1, the highest level of football in the country.

Founded in 1923 under the name Ruspina Sports, it was renamed Union Sportive Monastirienne in 1942. The new name reflects the union between Ruspina Sports and other clubs in town (swimming, petanque, etc.) and the Nationalists of Monastir (like Mustapha Ben Jannet).

Monastir has won two trophies in its history, as it won both the Tunisian Cup and Tunisian Super Cup in 2020.

History

Beginnings (1923–1956)
US Monastir is certainly one of the oldest teams in Tunisia. Although it was officially founded on 13 June 1942, the date of publication in the official journal of the decree of her creation, it birth dates back to 17 March 1923, the date of the founding of Ruspina Sports.

Among the players who were part of this first wave of the 1930s, we can cite Hédi Bourguiba, Hassine Guedira, Ali Ouerdani, Hamadi Gouider, Sadek Allègue, Ali El May, Mohamed Guilène, Fredj Jaâffar and Hassine R'him. The steering committee, for its part, is chaired by Mohamed Salah Sayadi (mayor of Monastir and member of the Grand Council).

At the end of the 1930s, Ruspina Sports experienced innumerable financial difficulties and a series of disgraces within the general public which, far from being insensitive to the misdeeds of colonialism, resolutely committed against it by creating teams of neighborhoods. Just as Ruspina Sports is in decline, voices are being raised to unify the other teams and create a kind of unique selection.

Mustapha Ben Jennet, nationalist and seasoned footballer, also fought against the narrow clanism and pled for a single and unique sports association. The choice of the term "union" is not accidental. On the contrary, it reflects this desire to present a united and homogeneous team. On 13 June 1942, the decree creating USM was signed and the new association inherited Ruspina Sports' credit balance, i.e. 5,395 Tunisian francs.

Forced, from its creation, to rest because of World War II, the USM organized friendly matches with the teams of El Makarem de Mahdia and the Etoile du Sahel (ESS), based in Sousse, a city which is hard hit by the bombings of 1942. Helping its neighbor, the USM bears the travel expenses of the ESS which amounted to 2,000 francs in 1945 and which the ESS reimbursed in 1954. If the end of the war coincided With a renewed interest and enthusiasm among the Monastirians for football, the USM has more than one hundred players, half of whom play in the senior team and the second half in the junior categories, the following years will be more difficult.

The USM, which had swapped the blue and white outfit to replace that of Ruspina Sports, begins to flourish by making the happiness of the thousands of spectators who, with the independence of the country in 1956 and the advent of the republican regime, will witness the metamorphosis of their team.

After independence (1956–1979)

With the independence of Tunisia, USM knew a turning point thanks to the interest of the leader Habib Bourguiba, first president of Tunisia, in his hometown of Monastir and in the team that he has never ceased to support. Already during the 1957–1958 season, the accounting register reported a donation of 15 dinars from Bourguiba, this donation increased to 200 dinars during the 1959–1960 season. But this material contribution does not represent anything in front of the moral support that Bourguiba brought by his presence in matches or in simple training of the USM at the end of which the Head of State does not hesitate to pose with the players for a souvenir photo.

For Mahmoud Chaouch, who presided over the destinies of USM during the 1962–1963 season:

"Never has USM known more exciting times than those following the country's independence. How many meetings have been enhanced by the presence of the Head of State in person without these matches being cup finals or having a stake in the championship? How many times has the President of the Republic donated significant sums for the benefit of the association without counting the internships of all the players abroad"

In the field, however, USM did not win any titles either in the Tunisian Cup or in the league. Each time, the USM returned to the charge and, after its successive relegations, goes back to the first division. It is during the 1961–1962 season that the USM reached for the first time in the national division after having spent two seasons in the third division (1957-1958 and 1958–1959) and one season (1959-1960) in the honor division.

Results between rise and fall (1980–2019)

The 1980s were a turning point for the club, which became semi-professional and allowed the team to remain in the national division for fourteen consecutive years, an unprecedented fact. During the 1984–1985 season, striker Nebil Kalboussi was ranked second in Ligue I tied with Tarak Dhiab of Esperance Sportive de Tunis and Khaled Touati of Club Africain. During the same season, USM qualified for the quarter-finals of the Tunisian Cup but lost in Monastir against the Club African (1-0) during the overtime session. The 1986–1987 season was undoubtedly the best year for the club. With eight wins, eight losses and ten draws, USM occupied a comfortable fifth place.

This situation does not last and the 1993–1994 season promised to be very difficult on all fronts and more particularly material. Four coaches followed one another to help a team in crisis since it suffered from several shortcomings. During the 1994–1995 season, the team found itself relegated to the third division according to the new organization of the Tunisian Football Federation. During the 1995–1996 season, Habib Allègue took the reins of the team which managed to win and advance to the honor division (southern pool) before returning to League I two seasons later and maintaining his position. In July 2006, Néji Stambouli succeeded Zouhair Chaouch, in place for six years, at the head of the club.

On 3 May 2009, after a victory against Esperance Sportif de Tunis at Stade El Menzah, on the score of three goals to two, the club qualified for the first Tunisian Cup final in its history: it opposed CS Sfaxien on May 24 at the November 7 stadium in Radès, and ends with a score of 1 to 0 for the Sfaxiens with the presence of president Zine El Abidine Ben Ali.

At the end of the 2009–2010 season, the club was relegated to Ligue II.

However, the team re-promoted to the first division after only one season, and its ranking ranged between fifth and tenth in the following years until it relegated in 2015 and the team spent two seasons in the second division before rising again in 2017.

After that, the teams presented respectable levels after the assignment of coach Skandar Kasri and Lassaad Dridi to finish the ranking in 2019 in seventh place.

Golden generation (2019–)
And at the beginning of the 2019 season, a contract was signed with Lassaad Chabbi, who has experience and training in the Austrian Football Bundesliga. With a group of players, the team was able to achieve excellent results, so that the 2019–2020 season was the best season in the club's history, as the team managed to take third place in the national league, which enabled it to participate in a continental competition for the first time in its history, namely the 2020–21 CAF Confederation Cup.

As for the Tunisian Cup (named the Habib Bourguiba Cup this season, on the occasion of the 20th anniversary of his death), the team managed to win it for the first time in its history, after beating Espérance Tunis in the final 2–0.

After Chabbi resigned from coaching the team, Afouène Gharbi, who finished the season in tenth place, was appointed. The team then contracted with Mourad Okbi, who succeeded in winning the team's second title in its history by obtaining the Tunisian Super Cup.

Achievements

National competitions.        
 Tunisian Ligue Professionnelle 1:
Runners-up : 2021–22
 Tunisian Cup: 1
Winners : 2019–20
 Runners-up : 2008–09
 Tunisian Super Cup: 1
Winners : 2019–20

African competitions

CAF Confederation Cup: 1 appearance
2020–21 –  Second Round

Regional competitions

Arab Champions League: 3 appearances
2006–07 – Round of 32
2007–08 – Round of 32
2008–09 – Quarter-finals

Colors 
The colors of US Monastir are white and blue. At home, the player wears a blue jersey, blue shorts and white socks. Outside of Monastir, the player wears a white jersey, white shorts and blue socks.

Players

Current squad

Out on loan

Current technical staff

Managers

Presidents

The first president of the club is the French Joseph Kalfati, followed by four other French: Peteche, Georges Rambi, Renaud and Fenech, while the first Tunisian president is Mohamed Salah Sayadi who takes the head of the club in 1929. Another Tunisian president, Salem B'chir, acceded to the presidency in 1953. We owe him for having established a sporting discipline and for putting an end to the laxity of certain players.

Home stadium 

The home stadium of US Monastir is the Mustapha Ben Jannet Stadium which is a multi-use stadium in Monastir, Tunisia.  It was used for the 2004 African Cup of Nations.  The stadium holds 20,000 people and sometimes, it's used as a home for Tunisia national football team.

It was inaugurated in 1958, this stadium with suspended tiers thanks to the technique of "cantilevered ball joint" used by the architect Olivier-Clément Cacoub initially offers a capacity of 3,000 places. Over time, several expansion works were carried out: its capacity was increased in the late 1990s to more than 10,000 places. On the occasion of the organization of the 2004 African Cup of Nations, new works allow to reach a capacity of 20,000 places.

The stadium is integrated into the sports complex of the city of Monastir, Tunisia, located a few hundred meters from the city center, which extends over 11 hectares and includes a sports hall, an indoor swimming pool, a tennis complex and various golf courses, training.

The stadium is named after Mustapha Ben Jannet, a nationalist militant executed by the French guards.

Rival clubs
  Étoile Sportive du Sahel (Derby)

External links 
 (Fr), (Ar) Official website
 (en) www.sofascore.com
 (en) Official Instagram Account

Football clubs in Tunisia
Association football clubs established in 1923
 
1923 establishments in Tunisia
Sports clubs in Tunisia